Blame It on Eve is the seventh studio album by Australian recording artist Adam Brand. The album was released in January 2008 and peaked at number 10 on the ARIA charts; becoming Brand's first top ten album.

Reception

Stewart Mason from AllMusic said "Brand's rough-hewn brand of country, rooted in honky tonk and the '70s outlaws, lacks the gloss necessary to make it onto mainstream country radio, but those raised on Waylon Jennings may find this to their liking. Highlights include the swaggering "Get on Down the Road," powered by a vintage-sounding organ part, and the wry title track, which compares favorably to some of John Hiatt's work. Brand's agreeably rough-edged voice is instantly appealing, and there's nothing about good-timey, twangy tunes like "Nothing Like a Good Day" and the Jimmy Buffett-like near-Caribbean lilt of "Simple Man"".

Track listing

Charts

Weekly charts

Year-end charts

Release history

References

2008 albums
Adam Brand (musician) albums